In basketball, points are the sum of the score accumulated through field goals (two or three points) and free throws (one point). It is a rare achievement for an individual player to score 100 points in a single game. What follows is an incomplete list of all of the verified occurrences of players scoring 100 points or more. Each individual instance of the accomplishment may have been achieved under varying circumstances, such as game length, opponent skill level and the league in which it occurred.

Internationally, the highest single player total between national teams is 116 points, scored by the Philippines' Lou Salvador in May 1923 against China. It happened during the 1923 Far Eastern Games. The highest single game total in worldwide organized basketball history, irrespective of gender, age or competition level, is 272 points, scored by a 13-year-old boy named Mats Wermelin of Sweden. He recorded every single point in his team's 272–0 win on February 5, 1974, during a regional boys' tournament held in Stockholm. As an adult, Wermelin played as a guard for Hammarby IF, Järfälla and Stockholm Capitals. The highest total by a female basketball player worldwide is 136, scored by Anat Draigor of Israel. It happened on April 5, 2006, in a 158–41 win. Draigor was 46 years old playing in an Israel Division III League playoff game, which also makes her the oldest player in history to score 100 points. Only one player, other than the United States' Bevo Francis and Jack Taylor, has recorded multiple 100-point games in organized competition. Croatia's Marin Ferenčević scored 101 and 178 points in April and May 2006, respectively, during Under-14 Croatian League matches.

In the United States, 100-point games have occurred at least once at most levels of education. At the middle school level, 13-year-old 8th grader Bob Harrison scored all 139 of his team's points in a 139–8 win on February 3, 1941. In high school, there have been 24 verified occurrences, 19 by male players and 5 by female players. The first recorded instance was in 1913, when Herman Saygar of Culver High School (Indiana) scored 113 points against Winamac High School. The first female to score 100 points at the high school level was Denise Long of Union-Whitten High School (Iowa), who scored 111 points during a state playoff game in the spring of 1968 against Dows High School. That season, Long's senior year of 1967–68, she averaged a still-standing national record 68.2 points per game. Her single game total stood as the high school female record for 38 years until Epiphanny Prince scored 113 for Murry Bergtraum High School (New York) on February 2, 2006. The boys' high school record is 135 points, scored by Danny Heater on January 26, 1960. Playing for Burnsville High School (West Virginia) against Widen High School, Heater made 53 of 70 field goals and 29 of 41 free throws. His 135-point outburst is still the highest total for the high school level worldwide.

At the college level, there have been seven 100-point games, two of which were recorded by Clarence "Bevo" Francis of Rio Grande College and two by Jack Taylor of Grinnell College. Francis scored 116 points against Ashland College on January 9, 1953, but the opponent was not a four-year institution, so the total did not count as the official college record. One year later, on February 2, 1954, Francis scored 113 against Hillsdale College, which was the recognized highest total in United States college basketball history for 59 years; Grinnell's Taylor scored 138 points on November 20, 2012 to set the new all-time NCAA all-divisions mark. He again recorded 100+ points on November 17, 2013 when he scored 109 against Crossroads College. Frank Selvy of Furman University is the only player to score 100 points at the Division I level. Selvy recorded exactly 100 points on February 13, 1954—less than two weeks after Francis scored 113—against Newberry College. He scored his 99th and 100th points on a 40-foot shot as the final buzzer sounded.

Professionally, there have been a number of occurrences of 100-point games worldwide. It has only happened once in the United States, however. Wilt Chamberlain of the National Basketball Association's Philadelphia Warriors scored 100 points on March 2, 1962 against the New York Knicks during a game played at Hersheypark Arena in Hershey, Pennsylvania. He made 36-of-63 field goals and 28-of-32 free throws, the latter being a particularly unusual statistic considering Chamberlain was a 51.1% free throw shooter for his career.

Key
Most of the players' exact statistics cannot be found, but whatever information was able to be verified is included. When a dash (—) appears in the three-point field goal statistic, it indicates that three-pointers had yet to be implemented and were therefore not an applicable statistic.

International

United States

Professional
National Basketball Association (NBA)

Collegiate

High school
Since 1913, 19 male and seven female players have scored 100 points or more in United States high school basketball games.

Others

See also

List of National Basketball Association single-game scoring leaders
List of NCAA Division I men's basketball players with 60 or more points in a game

Notes
 According to National Federation of State High School Associations, the game occurred on December 4, 1971. According to MaxPreps.com, the game occurred on January 20, 1971. The January date is confirmed by The Northwest Arkansas Times and other news articles.

References

100